Methia fischeri is a species of beetle in the family Cerambycidae. It was described by Melzer in 1923.

References

Methiini
Beetles described in 1923